The Nyubskaya narrow-gauge railway is located in Arkhangelsk Oblast, Russia.

Current status 
The Nyubskaya forestry railway's first line was constructed in 1934, in the area of Kotlassky District, Arkhangelsk Oblast from the village Kharitonovo. The railway operates scheduled freight services from Kharitonovo, used for forestry tasks such as the transportation of felled logs and forestry workers.

Rolling stock

Locomotives 
 TU6D – № 0235
 TU6A – № 2800, 3169
 TU7A – № 3289
 TU8 – №  0006, 0181, 0527, 0334

Railroad cars 
 Boxcar
 Tank car
 Snowplow
 Dining car
 Crane LT-110
 Passenger car
 Railway log-car and Flatcar
 Hopper car to transport track ballast

Gallery

See also
Narrow-gauge railways in Russia
List of Russian narrow-gauge railways rolling stock

References

External links

 Official website OJSC «Ilim Group»
 Nyubskaya railway (interactive map)
 Photo - project «Steam Engine» 
 «The site of the railroad» S. Bolashenko 
750 mm gauge railways in Russia
Railway lines opened in 1934
Rail transport in Arkhangelsk Oblast
Logging railways in Russia
1934 establishments in the Soviet Union